The 2012–13 Serbian SuperLiga (known as the Jelen SuperLiga for sponsorship reasons) was the seventh season of the Serbian SuperLiga since its establishment. The season began on 26 August 2012 and ended on 25 May 2013.

A total of 16 teams contested the league, including 14 sides from the 2011–12 season and two promoted from the 2011–12 Serbian First League. Partizan successfully defended their title. Last two teams, BSK Borča and Smederevo were relegated, while 14th team played play-off with 3rd placed team from 2012–13 Serbian First League.

Teams
Metalac and Borac Čačak were relegated to the 2012–13 Serbian First League after the last season for finishing in 16th and 15th place, respectively. Metalac completed a three-year tenure in the league, while Borac was relegated after competing in top-tier football for nine seasons.

The relegated teams were replaced by 2011–12 First League champions Radnički Niš and runners-up Donji Srem. Radnički will be returning to the top tier for the first time since the season 2002–03, while this will be first season in top-tier competition for Donji Srem.

Stadiums and locations

All figures for stadiums include seating capacity only, as many stadiums in Serbia have stands without seats which would otherwise depict the actual number of people able to attend football matches not regulated by UEFA or FIFA.

Personnel and kits

Note: Flags indicate national team as has been defined under FIFA eligibility rules. Players and Managers may hold more than one non-FIFA nationality.

Nike is the official ball supplier for Serbian SuperLiga.

Transfers
For the list of transfers involving SuperLiga clubs during 2012–13 season, please see: List of Serbian football transfers winter 2012–13 and List of Serbian football transfers summer 2012.

League table

Results

Awards

Top goalscorers
Sources: Superliga official website, soccerway.com

Top assists
Sources: Superliga official website, soccerway.com

* Italic highlights the former club, while bold the current one.

Hat-tricks

Team of the Season

Fair play award

Attendance
The 2012–13 season saw an average attendance by club:

* due to previous crowd troubles, audience was not allowed on some games

Champion squad

References

External links

SuperLiga at UEFA.com
SuperLiga at soccerway.com
Statistics
Srbijafudbal

Serbian SuperLiga seasons
1
Serbia